26th Battalion may refer to:

26th Battalion (Australia), a World War I ANZAC battalion
2/26th Battalion (Australia), a World War II Australian infantry battalion
26th Battalion (New Brunswick), CEF, a World War I battalion for the Canadian Corps
 26th Battalion (New Zealand), a World War II infantry battalion

See also
 26th Division (disambiguation)
 26th Brigade (disambiguation)
 26th Regiment (disambiguation)